Barrington Stopford Thomas Mills (30 September 1821 – 5 February 1899) was an English first-class cricketer and clergyman.

The son of The Reverend Thomas Mills, he was born in September 1821 at Great Saxham, Suffolk. He was educated at Harrow School, before going up to Christ Church, Oxford. While studying at Oxford, he played first-class cricket for Oxford University from 1841–43, making eight appearances. In addition to playing for Oxford, Mills also made three first-class appearances for the Marylebone Cricket Club in 1844 and 1845. Playing as a bowler, he took a total of 34 wickets in his eleven first-class matches, taking a five wicket haul on three occasions.

After graduating from Oxford, Mills took holy orders in the Church of England in 1858. He served as the rector of Lawshall from 1858 until his death at Bury St Edmunds in 1899. Mills was married to Georgiana Penelope Sturt, the daughter of Henry Sturt and Lady Charlotte Penelope Brudenell, with her predeceasing him by two years.

References

External links

1821 births
1899 deaths
People from the Borough of St Edmundsbury
People educated at Harrow School
Alumni of Christ Church, Oxford
English cricketers
Oxford University cricketers
Marylebone Cricket Club cricketers
19th-century English Anglican priests